Hastings High School is one of the oldest operating public high schools in the U.S. state of Minnesota. It is in Hastings, and is part of Independent School District 200.

About
A new building was built in 2001. Its construction centered on a bridge connecting the athletic portion of the school to the academic.  

Hastings High School enrolls about 1,800 students in grades 912 and has a graduation rate of 97%. It is positioned on over 100 acres near the Mississippi River.

Communities served by Hastings Public Schools (ISD 200)

Cities:
 Hastings (pop. 22,424)
 Hampton (pop. 689)
 Miesville (pop. 125)
 New Trier (pop. 112)
 Vermillion (pop. 419)
Townships:
 Denmark (pop. 1,348)
 Douglas (pop. 760)
 Hampton Township (pop. 968)
 Marshan (pop. 1,263)
 Nininger (pop. 865)
 Ravenna (2,336)
 Vermillion Township (pop. 1,243)

Athletics

State championships 

^^ = Indicates the Mississippi Valley State Champions. 
^ = Pre-Minnesota State High School League.

Notable alumni
 Jackie Biskupski, politician
 George Conzemius, Minnesota state senator and educator
 Mark Doten, novelist
 Aaron Fox (ice hockey), professional ice hockey player
 Craig Kilborn, original host of The Daily Show, former anchor on ESPN's SportsCenter, and former host of CBS's The Late Late Show
 Mark Steven Johnson, Filmmaker
 Larry LaCoursiere, professional boxer
 Derek Stepan, professional ice hockey player for the Carolina Hurricanes
 Jeff Taffe, professional ice hockey player
 Dean Talafous, professional ice hockey player
 Ben Utecht, former NFL tight end; singer

References

1866 establishments in Minnesota
Buildings and structures in Hastings, Minnesota
Public high schools in Minnesota
Schools in Dakota County, Minnesota